Rice works (stylized: rice works) is a line of gluten-free whole grain brown rice crisps launched in 2005 by Snack Alliance and marketed in the United States, Canada, Mexico, and the United Kingdom.

Rice works was acquired by Shearer's Foods in 2010 from Snack Alliance and its Canadian affiliate (collectively, “Snack Alliance”).

History

Riceworks was placed on store shelves in 2006. The brand was acquired by Shearer's Foods, Inc. in March 2010.

Awards 
Riceworks was voted as the 2010 Product of the Year Canada in the snacks category.

References

Brand name snack foods